Cooperativa de Productores de Leche Dos Pinos R.L (abbreviated as COOPROLE R.L. but more popularly known as “Dos Pinos”) is a Costa Rican cooperative producer of dairy, beverages, and candy products headquartered in Alajuela, Costa Rica. It has a brand portfolio of over 600 brands  and its products are sold throughout Central America and the Caribbean.

Dos Pinos is structured as cooperative where partners who invested in the organization share in the profits according to their shares. It is regulated by Costa Rican law under the "Ley general de cooperativas".

Origins 
Cooperativa de Productores de Leche R.L. (popularly known as “Dos Pinos”) was founded in 1947 by a group of 25 dairy farmers from Costa Rica  seeking to unite in order to have a stable plant through which they could sell their milk due to the issues with the fluctuation of demand on a product that is perishable.

This initial phase of the business of Dos Pinos was successful but it was not until 1952 that it enters the business of processing and pasteurization of milk. In these initial years the cooperative was forced to diversify its business because milk prices were regulated in Costa Rica which limited the profitability of the business. The cooperative decided to focus then on the “noble products” (dairy derivatives) which helped its bottom line and helped it expand its number of processing plants. In 1978 Dos Pinos opened a large powdered milk plant in Ciudad Quesada allowing it to better process milk from the northern part of the country. In 1982 it was reported that the company had 10 operating plants in Costa Rica. In 1985 Dos Pinos opened its dairy aseptic filling plant using Tetra Brik packaging which allowed it to introduce longer lasting milk into the market. In 1988 the firm completed its first formal export order abroad opening itself to selling to nearby countries.

Expansion 
In 2007 it opened its operations in Guatemala by building a large distribution center and setting aside space for a future processing plant. In 2008 through an alliance with Cooleche Dos Pinos branded milk started being sold in Panama; also in 2013 the cooperative purchased Planta Nevada from "Cervecería Nacional de Panamá" which produces milk and juice beverages. In August 2015 Dos Pinos acquired the industrial products company “La Completa” in Chontales, Nicaragua in order to boost its presence in that country.  In September 2016 Dos Pinos diversified its operations with the acquisition of the “Gallito” candy confectionary subsidiary from Mondelez International by $6.7 million dollars.

Brands 
Dairy Products:
 Pinito  (powdered milk)
 Delactomy Milk
 Deligurt (liquid yogurt)
 Lula (flavored milk)
 Queso Crema (cream cheese)

Gallito Candy Products:
 Morenito
 Guayabita
 Milán
 Milán Menta
 Tapita
 Fresa
 Piña Colada
 Pie de limón
 Tapita Navideña
 Violetas
 Mentas
 Copetines
 Mini Tapita
 Tri-Tapita

Ice cream products
 Trits
 Vanilla-Strawberry-Lemon
 Milan
 Milan Menta
 Tapita
 Guayabita
 Mini Sandwich

Restaurants
 La Estación Dos Pinos

References

External links 
 Dos Pinos official website 

Food and drink companies of Costa Rica